Tiphiinae is one of the two subfamilies of the flower wasp family Tiphiidae, the other being the Nearctic Brachycistidinae. It is the larger of the two and has a worldwide distribution.

Characteristics
Tiphiinae are small to medium sized solitary wasps, up to 25 mm in length. The eyes are ovate and do not demonstrate emargination. The males have 10-13 antennal segments while the females have 10-12. The antennae may, or may not be, bent at a sharp angle. The thorax is normally coloured orange-red or black and the thorax of the wingless females has distinct dorsal segmentation. The pronotum is long and extends posteriorly towards the tegulae. The spiracle cover lobes on the pronotum are lined with close fine hairs. There is no suture on the mesopleuron. Wings are present in all males but females may be winged or wingless. If wings are present they are not folded longitudinally. Fore-wings have a distinct pterostigma; and the wing venation is well developed. The legs show a fore femur which is not obviously thickened.

Taxonomy
The following genera are among those included in the Tiphiinae:

Cabaraxa Nagy, 1974
Cyanotiphia  Cameron, 1907
Epomidiopteron Romand, 1835
Icronatha Nagy, 1967
Krombeinia Pate, 1947
Ludita Nagy, 1967
Mallochessa Allen, 1972
Megatiphia Kimsey, 1993
Neotiphia Malloch, 1918
Paratiphia Sichel, 1864
Pseudotiphia Ashmead 1903
Tiphia Fabricius, 1775

References

Apocrita subfamilies
Tiphiidae